The 2019 Las Vegas Bowl was a college football bowl game played on December 21, 2019, with kickoff at 7:30 p.m. EST (4:30 p.m. local PST) on ABC. It was the 28th edition of the Las Vegas Bowl, and one of the 2019–20 bowl games concluding the 2019 FBS football season. Sponsored by automotive manufacturer Mitsubishi Motors, the game was officially known as the Mitsubishi Motors Las Vegas Bowl.

This was the last edition of the Las Vegas Bowl played at Sam Boyd Stadium, the venue of the game since its inception in 1992, as the bowl will move to Allegiant Stadium in nearby Paradise for the 2020 playing. This was also the last edition to have a conference tie-in with Mountain West, as starting with the 2020 playing, the bowl's tie-ins will be structured to feature a Pac-12 team against either a Big Ten team or SEC team.

Teams
The game was played between the Boise State Broncos, champions of the Mountain West Conference, and the Washington Huskies of the Pac-12 Conference. It was a rematch of the 2012 Maaco Bowl Las Vegas, which saw Boise State defeat Washington, 28–26. This was the fifth overall meeting between Boise State and Washington; the teams split their prior four meetings, 2–2.

Boise State Broncos

Boise State finished atop the Mountain Division of Mountain West, then defeated Hawaii in the Mountain West  Championship Game, 31–10. The Broncos entered the bowl with a record of 12–1 (8–0 in conference), ranked 18th in the AP Poll.

Washington Huskies

Washington entered the bowl with a record of 7–5 (4–5 in conference). The Huskies finished in a three-way tie for second place in the North Division of the Pac-12.

Game summary

Statistics

References

External links

Game statistics at statbroadcast.com

Las Vegas Bowl
Las Vegas Bowl
Las Vegas Bowl
Las Vegas Bowl
Boise State Broncos football bowl games
Washington Huskies football bowl games